The North Branch Marsh River is a  tidal river in the town of Frankfort, Waldo County, Maine. It is a tributary of Marsh Bay, an arm of the tidal Penobscot River.

The North Branch Marsh River is fed by Marsh Stream, a  river in central Maine. It flows northeast through Knox, Brooks, and Monroe, then becomes the boundary between the towns of Winterport and Frankfort. Turning southeast, the stream flows through the village of Frankfort, where it reaches tidewater and becomes the North Branch Marsh River.

See also
List of rivers of Maine

References

Maine Streamflow Data from the USGS
Maine Watershed Data From Environmental Protection Agency

Rivers of Waldo County, Maine
Tributaries of the Penobscot River